Shiplake College Boat Club is a rowing club based on the River Thames at Shiplake College Boathouse, Henley-on-Thames, Oxfordshire.

History
Shiplake College was founded in 1959 by Alexander and Eunice Everett. The boat club is owned by Shiplake College and rowing became a primary college sport due to its location on the banks of the River Thames. In 2020 The Davies Centre was completed, incorporating a new boat storage and indoor training facilities. It was officially opened for former headmaster Gregg Davies in 2021, delayed due to the Covid-19 pandemic.

In recent years the club has won both the prestigious Schools' Head of the River Race and the Non-Championship Eights at the National Schools' Regatta.

Shiplake Vikings
The Shiplake Vikings Rowing Club share the rowing facilities of the college.

Honours

National Schools' Regatta

Schools' Head of the River Race

Henley Royal Regatta

Henley Women's Regatta

British Junior Championships

Course Records Currently Held

References

Sport in Oxfordshire
Henley-on-Thames
Rowing clubs in England
Rowing clubs in Oxfordshire
Rowing clubs of the River Thames
Scholastic rowing in the United Kingdom